The following is a list of Michigan State Historic Sites in Newaygo County, Michigan. Sites marked with a dagger (†) are also listed on the National Register of Historic Places in Newaygo County, Michigan.


Current listings

See also
 National Register of Historic Places listings in Newaygo County, Michigan

Sources
 Historic Sites Online – Newaygo County. Michigan State Housing Developmental Authority. Accessed January 23, 2011.

References

Newaygo County
State Historic Sites
Tourist attractions in Newaygo County, Michigan